Schneider National, Inc. is a provider of truckload, intermodal and logistics services. Schneider's services include regional, long-haul, expedited, dedicated, bulk, intermodal, brokerage, cross-dock logistics, pool point distribution, supply chain management, and port logistics.

History
Founded in 1935 when Al Schneider sold the family car to buy his first truck, Schneider is headquartered in Green Bay, Wisconsin. Don Schneider, Al's oldest son, succeeded Al as president on February 9, 1976, and served in that role for 27 years. In 2002, Christopher Lofgren was named the company's third president and CEO.

Schneider began trading on the New York Stock Exchange on April 6, 2017; company management rang the opening bell. The stock had an initial public offering of $19.50 per share.

Market
Schneider hauls 19,318 loads per day, with 11,650 company drivers, 10,120 company trucks and 33,830 trailers on the road. The company has 166 facilities, conducting business in the United States, Mexico and China. Schneider's customers include more than two-thirds of the FORTUNE 500 companies.

See also

 Trucking industry in the United States
 Truck driver

References

External links
 Schneider

Trucking companies of the United States
Companies based in Green Bay, Wisconsin
American companies established in 1935
Transport companies established in 1935
2017 initial public offerings
1935 establishments in Wisconsin
Companies listed on the New York Stock Exchange